Southern Airways Express serves the following destinations:

Former Destinations

References

Regional airlines of the United States